Honório Pereira Barreto (April 24, 1813– April 16 or 26, 1859) was a governor of the Portuguese colony of Guinea (or ‘province’ as it was referred to during the time of his administration).

Biography

Honório Barreto was born in Portuguese Guinea of a Guinean mother and Cape Verdean father João Pereira Barreto, Jr., he was educated in Lisbon.  He maintained Portuguese control of the area and even extended its influence. Prior to the independence of Guinea-Bissau, Barreto was cited by the Portuguese as the most famous governor and an example of what the local population might achieve.  He was captain major (governor) of Cacheu for three terms, the first was between March 30, 1834 to 1835, the second between 1846 and 1848 and the third in 1852.  However, Barreto also ran a family business with his mother from the settlement of Cacheu, where the principal products of their mercantile dealings were slaves.  He was also captain major (governor) of Bissau as 27th Captain Major between 13 March 1837 and 27 June 1839, the 54th between 1840 and 1841, the 56th in 1853 and 1854 and the 59th from 19 April 1858 up to his death on 16 or 26 April 1859.

He died at Fortaleza de São José da Amura in Bissau at 8:30 AM on either 16 or 26 April 1859 when he was in service.

Honours
He was featured in a $500 and $1000 Guinea-Bissau escudo.

A corvette of the Portuguese Navy was named after him.  Also a small street (as a largo) is named after him in the neighborhood of Beato, Lisbon.

See also
List of Captains-Major of Bissau
List of Captains-Major of Cacheu

Notes

References

External links
Rosa de Carvalho Alvarenga and Honório Pereira Barreto at adbissau.org 

Barretto, Honorio Pereira
Barretto, Honorio Pereira
Cape Verdean politicians
Barreto, Honorio Pereira
Portuguese people of Cape Verdean descent
Governors of Portuguese Guinea